The Jakarta Foreign Correspondents Club (JFCC) is a non-profit organization for international journalists in Indonesia. 

The group has more than 250 members and 50 foreign media organizations [1]. Its members include foreign journalists, Indonesian journalists, diplomats, analysts, business people and corporations [2].  The JFCC regularly hosts speakers and public forums on issues of interest to international media, as well as informal social events.

The club has met in several different venues over the past 40 years, including the Hotel Indonesia, The Sari Pan Pacific, The Mandarin Oriental Hotel, and the Intercontinental Hotel.

The JFCC awards three annual scholarships, the Sander Thoenes[3], Harry Burton[4], and Morgan Mellish funds, each in remembrance of former members who died during the course of their work.

External links 
 http://www.jfcc.info/jfcc.php?id=0000

Foreign correspondents' clubs
Organizations based in Jakarta
Indonesian journalism organizations